Clanculus jussieui is a species of sea snail, a marine gastropod mollusk in the family Trochidae, the top snails.

The species was named in honor of M. Adrien-Henri de Jussieu, "professeur au Jardin du Roi."

Description
The height of the shell attains 11 mm, its diameter 14 mm. The umbilicate shell has a depressed-globose conic shape. It is, polished, shining, blackish, olive or purplish brown, unicolored, dotted or tessellated with white, often with short flames of white beneath the sutures and always more or less marked with white around the umbilicus . The spire is conical. The sutures are simple and impressed. The 5 to 6 whorls are convex. The upper surface is marked with obsolete, frequently almost imperceptible line, the interstices between them finely spirally striate. The base of the shell is smoother, and lightly concentrically marked around the center. The aperture is rounded. The outer and basal margins are crenulated within. The columella bears a small tooth above and below, concave between them, deeply entering the umbilicus, but inserted on its edge. The umbilicus is rather deep, smooth within and bordered by an irregularly crenulated rib.

Distribution
THis species occurs in the Mediterranean Sea and in the Atlantic Ocean off Portugal.

References

 Payraudeau B. C., 1826: Catalogue descriptif et méthodique des Annelides et des Mollusques de l'île de Corse, Paris pp. 218 + 8 pl.
 Risso A., 1826–1827: Histoire naturelle des principales productions de l'Europe Méridionale et particulièrement de celles des environs de Nice et des Alpes Maritimes; Paris, Levrault
 Cantraine, 1842: Diagnoses de quelques espèces nouvelles de coquilles soit natives soit fossiles, appartenant au bassin méditerranéen; Bulletins de l'Académie Royale des Sciences et Belles-lettres de Bruxelles 9(2): 340–349 
 Philippi R. A., 1844: Enumeratio molluscorum Siciliae cum viventium tum in tellure tertiaria fossilium, quae in itinere suo observavit. Vol. 2; Eduard Anton, Halle [Halis Saxorum] iv + 303 p., pl. 13-28 
 Monterosato T. A. (di), 1880: Notizie intorno ad alcune conchiglie delle coste d'Africa ; Bullettino della Società Malacologica Italiana, Pisa 5: 213–233. (1879)
 Monterosato T. A. (di), 1889 (1 gennaio): Coquilles marines marocaines; Journal de Conchyliologie 7 (1): 20–40 7 (2): 112–121
 Pallary P., 1900: Coquilles marines du littoral du Départment d'Oran; Journal de Conchyliologie 48 (3): 211–422, pl. 6-8
 Gofas, S.; Le Renard, J.; Bouchet, P. (2001). Mollusca, in: Costello, M.J. et al. (Ed.) (2001). European register of marine species: a check-list of the marine species in Europe and a bibliography of guides to their identification. Collection Patrimoines Naturels, 50: pp. 180–213

External links
 

jussieui
Gastropods described in 1826